A battle cry is a yell or chant taken up in battle.

Battle Cry may also refer to:

Music 
Battle Cry (Omen album), the debut album of American heavy metal band Omen
Battlecry (Two Steps from Hell album), a 2015 album by the band Two Steps from Hell
Battle Cry (Judas Priest album)
Battle Cry (Judas Priest video)
Battle Cry: Worship from the Frontlines, a 2005 album by Christian singer Michael Gungor
"Battle Cry" (Angel Haze song), 2014
"Battle Cry" (Havana Brown song), 2015
"Battle Cry" (Imagine Dragons song), 2014
"Battle Cry" (Shontelle song), 2009
"Battle Cry", a song from the 2006 Army of the Pharaohs album The Torture Papers
"Battle Cry", a song from the 2014 Judas Priest album Redeemer of Souls
"Battle Cry", a song from the 2019 Polo G album Die a Legend
"Battlecry", opening theme song of the anime Samurai Champloo

Games 
Battle Cry (game), an Avalon Hill board game based on the American Civil War
Battle Cry (Milton Bradley game), a 1961 board game
BattleCry (video game), a cancelled video game
BattleCry Studios, a video game developer
Battlecry, a 1991 video game by Home Data
Robotech: Battlecry, a 2002 video game

Other uses 
Battle Cry (film), a 1955 film starring Van Heflin, based on the Leon Uris novel
Battlecry (racehorse), 16th-place finisher in the 2009 Grand National
Battle Cry (Uris novel), published in 1953
Battle Cry, a novel by American writer John Barnes
Battle Cry Campaign, an initiative of the parachurch organization Teen Mania Ministries, primarily ministering to US teenagers

See also